Chennai City Roads Highways Division (Construction & Maintenance) is responsible to develop and maintain the Highway network in the district and also ensures road safety and to cope with the future economic development.

In Chennai City Roads Highways (C&M) Division, the total length of 254.4 Kilometre of Government roads are maintained.

Classification 
The Classification of road are as follows

State Highways (SH) the total length of Kilometre is 186.25

Major District Roads (MDR) the total length of Kilometre is 18.71

Other District Roads (ODR) the total length of Kilometre is 49.395

State Highways

Major District Roads

Other District Roads

See also 
 Highways of Tamil Nadu 
 Road Network in Tamil Nadu
 National Highways
 List of National Highways in India
 List of National Highways in India (by Highway Number)
 National Highways Authority of India

References 

Roads in Tamil Nadu
Tamil Nadu highways
Tamil Nadu-related lists